A quantum sort is any sorting algorithm that runs on a quantum computer. Any comparison-based quantum sorting algorithm would take at least  steps, which is already achievable by classical algorithms. Thus, for this task, quantum computers are no better than classical ones. However, in space-bounded sorts, quantum algorithms outperform their classical counterparts.

References

Sorting algorithms
Quantum algorithms